{{DISPLAYTITLE:C12H17NO2}}
The molecular formula C12H17NO2 (molar mass : 207.26 g/mol, exact mass : 207.125929) may refer to:

 Ciclopirox
 EDMA
 Fenobucarb
 MADAM-6
 Methylbenzodioxolylbutanamine
 Methylenedioxydimethylamphetamine
 3,4-Methylenedioxy-N-ethylamphetamine
 Methylenedioxymethylphentermine
 4-Methyl-2,5-methoxyphenylcyclopropylamine
 Mexedrone
 Promecarb, used in insecticides